Willa Nasatir (born 1990) is an American visual artist and photographer. In 2017, Nasatir presented a solo exhibition at the Whitney Museum organized by Jane Panetta.

Life and work 
Willa Nasatir was born in 1990 in Los Angeles, California. She attended Cooper Union and received a BFA degree in 2012. Nasatir was a recipient of the Louis B. Comfort Tiffany Foundation Award in 2015.

She uses a spectrum of material and optical technics to make images. From soaking prints in water, sanding them down, burning and freezing them, then rephotographing them through translucent textured screens. Nasatir does not manipulate the images on the computer, letting the surreal effects happen entirely in the camera.

Exhibitions 
 September–October 2015 – White Room, White Columns, New York City, New York
March–April, 2016 – Chapter NY, New York City, New York
September–October, 2016 – François Ghebaly Gallery, Los Angeles, California
 February–June 2017 – Albright-Knox Art Gallery, Buffalo, New York
 July–October 2017 – Whitney Museum of American Art, New York City, New York, organized by Jane Panetta
2019 – Studio Photography: 1887-2019, Simon Lee Gallery, New York City, New York

References

External links 
 Locating the Photographs of Willa Nasatir - Jane Panetta

Living people
21st-century American artists
Cooper Union alumni
1990 births
American contemporary artists
Artists from Los Angeles